Lac d'Avoriaz is a lake in Haute-Savoie, France.

Avoriaz